Israel Enoc Escalante (born 9 January 1999) is an Argentine professional footballer who plays as a winger for Liga Deportiva Alajuelense, on loan from Boca Juniors.

Career
Escalante joined Boca Juniors in 2014. He spent six years progressing through their ranks, before departing on loan in July 2020 to Categoría Primera A side Independiente Medellín. He made his senior debut under manager Aldo Bobadilla on 16 September, featuring for fifty-five minutes of a Copa Libertadores group stage defeat to Caracas; he came off the bench to replace Andrés Rodríguez in the first half. His first league match arrived days later versus Alianza Petrolera, which was followed by an appearance against parent club Boca in the Libertadores; he left at half time of a narrow loss.

Escalante scored his first senior goal on 8 October 2020 in a league win for Independiente Medellín over Cúcuta Deportivo, which was followed by another on 25 October at home to Deportivo Cali.

Career statistics
.

Notes

References

External links

1999 births
Living people
People from Resistencia, Chaco
Argentine footballers
Association football forwards
Argentine expatriate footballers
Expatriate footballers in Colombia
Argentine expatriate sportspeople in Colombia
Categoría Primera A players
Boca Juniors footballers
Independiente Medellín footballers
Sportspeople from Chaco Province